Robert Quillen Office and Library is an historic office and library building located at Fountain Inn, Greenville County, South Carolina. It was built in 1928, and is a small one-story, one-room brick Neo-Classical Revival building with a distinctive temple front. Directly in front of the Office are a rectangular reflecting pool and a round pool, and a granite obelisk known as the "Monument to Eve." Born in 1887 in Syracuse, Kansas, Robert Quillen moved to Fountain Inn in 1911 to start the Fountain Inn Tribune. He wrote paragraphs, editorials, one-liners, and cartoons for Baltimore Sun, Saturday Evening Post, and The American Magazine. Quillen died after a prolonged illness on December 9, 1948.

The building was listed on the National Register of Historic Places in 2012.

References 

Office buildings on the National Register of Historic Places in South Carolina
Libraries on the National Register of Historic Places in South Carolina
Buildings and structures completed in 1928
Neoclassical architecture in South Carolina
National Register of Historic Places in Greenville County, South Carolina
Buildings and structures in Greenville County, South Carolina
1928 establishments in South Carolina